This is a list of the members of the European Parliament group European United Left–Nordic Green Left (EUL/NGL) from 2009 until 2014.

List

7th European Parliament (2009–2014)

European United Left–Nordic Green Left